Gambang may refer to:

Gambang (instrument), xylophone-like instrument used among people of Indonesia
Gambang, Pahang, town in Kuantan District, Pahang, Malaysia

See also 
Gambang kromong, a traditional orchestra of Betawi people